Specialty Doctor is a contract for doctors working in hospitals in the UK NHS. The previous grades of Staff Grade and Associate Specialist were subsumed into this new grade when it was introduced in 2008. The Specialty Doctor role requires four years postgraduate experience, two in specialty, although many Specialty Doctors now have more than this. In 2021 a new senior contract for Specialty Doctors to progress to, the "Specialist" was introduced.

There are more than 9,000 Specialty Doctors in the UK and you are very likely to be seen by one if admitted to the care of a hospital specialist. Most report to a consultant but have many years of specialty experience and they are employed on a contract similar to that for consultants. Specialty Doctors usually perform more direct patient care than their consultant colleagues as they are not normally involved in management, yet will generally have more experience and skills than the majority of their colleagues in the training grades.

References

External links
 The SAS Grades - background history  - The British Medical Association | Wayback Machine
 http://www.nhsemployers.org/PayAndContracts/MedicalandDentalContracts/StaffAndAssociateSpecialistDrs/Pages/AssociateSpecialists-Homepage.aspx

National Health Service
Healthcare occupations in the United Kingdom